Wet Mountains National Forest was established as the Wet Mountains Forest Reserve by the U.S. Forest Service in Colorado on June 12, 1905 with . It became a National Forest on March 4, 1907. On July 1, 1908 the forest was combined with San Isabel National Forest and the name was discontinued.

References

External links
Forest History Society
Forest History Society:Listing of the National Forests of the United States Text from Davis, Richard C., ed. Encyclopedia of American Forest and Conservation History. New York: Macmillan Publishing Company for the Forest History Society, 1983. Vol. II, pp. 743-788.

Former National Forests of Colorado